The Green List (Croatian: Zelena lista or ZL) s a green political party in Croatia. It was founded in 2017 prior to 2017 local elections in which they run in coalition with Bandić Milan 365 – Labour and Solidarity Party. In addition to their green politics, the party is the party is Christian Democratic compared to other green parties in the world.

History 
Green List was founded in 2017 by graduate engineer in agronomy Nenad Matić, ex member of Croatian Peasant Party. The party shares name with defunct liberal Green List (2005-2014), but the membership is ideologically different.

In 2017 party first time appeared on the ballot together with the current mayor of Zagreb Milan Bandić and two more parties, winning one seat.Four years later party entered in coalition with Homeland Movement and supporting Miroslav Škoro as candidate for mayor. Party won one seat again.

In 2019 Green List participated in European elections solo but failed to pass threshold.

During 2019-20 presidential election they supported Miroslav Škoro as a candidate.

In 2020 parliamentary Green List entered coalition of several conservative and right wing parties led by Homeland Movement, but did not won any seats.

Elections

Zagreb Assembly

European Parliament

Croatian Parliament

President of Croatia

See also 
 Green party
 Green politics
 List of environmental organizations

References

External links 
 Official website

Green political parties in Croatia
Political parties established in 2017
2017 establishments in Croatia